Pan'an County is a county of central Zhejiang province, China. It is under the administration of the Jinhua city.

Administrative divisions
Towns:
Anwen (安文镇), Shanghu (尚湖镇), Fangqian (方前镇), Xinwo (新渥镇), Jianshan (尖山镇), Yushan (玉山镇), Renchuan (仁川镇), Dapan (大盘镇), Lengshui (冷水镇)

Townships:
Huzhai Township (胡宅乡), Yaochuan Township (窈川乡), Shuangxi Township (双溪乡), Shenze Township (深泽乡), Shuangfeng Township (双峰乡), Panfeng Township (盘峰乡), Weixin Township (维新乡), Gao'er Township (高二乡), Jiuhe Township (九和乡), Wancang Township (万苍乡)

Transportation 
Pan'an South railway station is on the Jinhua–Taizhou railway.

References

 
County-level divisions of Zhejiang
Jinhua